Putravati is a Marathi movie released on 19 April 1996. The movie has been produced by M.B.Joshi and directed by Bhaskar Jadhav.

Cast 
 Nilu Phule
 Sukanya Kulkarni
 Asha Kale
 Avinash Narkar
Madhu Apte
Bal Dhuri
Kalap Joshi

Soundtrack
The music is provided by Sridhar Phadke.

References

External links 

1996 films
1990s Marathi-language films